Winnellie is a northern suburb of Darwin, Northern Territory, in the Northern Territory of Australia.

History

Winnellie is an industrial suburb to the south of Darwin International Airport. The name came from the 'Winnellie Camp' formed there by the Army in 1941. Recently there has been some newer residential areas in the suburb.

References

External links

 http://www.nt.gov.au/lands/lis/placenames/origins/greaterdarwin.shtml#w
 City of Darwin Community Profiles

Suburbs of Darwin, Northern Territory